Fábio Rafael Rodrigues Cardoso (born 19 April 1994) is a Portuguese professional footballer who plays as a centre-back for FC Porto.

Formed at Benfica, where he played only in the reserves, he made over 150 Primeira Liga appearances for Paços de Ferreira, Vitória Setúbal, Santa Clara and Porto. Abroad, he had a brief spell in the Scottish Premiership with Rangers.

Club career

Benfica B
Born in Águeda, Aveiro District, Cardoso played as a youth for hometown club R.D. Águeda before joining S.L. Benfica in 2008. On 11 August 2012, he made his debut with Benfica B in a 2012–13 Segunda Liga match against Braga B where he played 84 minutes as a centre back, partnering with Lionel Carole. On 19 December, he had his only call-up to the first team under manager Jorge Jesus, as one of five new faces for a Taça da Liga group game at Olhanense; he was an unused substitute in the 2–1 win.

He scored the only goal in a victory at Sporting B (0–1) on 5 January 2015. Six days later, he scored twice in a 3–2 win against Porto B.

On 15 January 2015, Benfica announced Cardoso's loan to fellow Primeira Liga club Paços de Ferreira until the end of the season. The deal was subsequently repeated for the following campaign. In 42 total matches for the northern club, he scored once, the only goal of a win at Vitória de Guimarães on 13 March 2016.

Vitória de Setúbal
On 7 July 2016, Cardoso signed a four-year contract with Primeira Liga side Vitória de Setúbal. He made 27 total appearances in his only season, and scored in a 2–1 win over Santa Clara on 26 October to qualify the team to the group stage of the Taça da Liga.

Rangers
In June 2017, Cardoso signed for Rangers on a three-year contract for a reported fee of around £1.3 million. He made his debut for Rangers against Progrès Niederkorn in the Europa League on 29 June 2017. Cardoso was picked less frequently after the departure of compatriot manager Pedro Caixinha, and was released from his contract with Rangers on 30 July 2018.

Santa Clara
Cardoso joined Santa Clara on a four-year deal the day after leaving Rangers. On his second league appearance on 19 August 2018, he scored the equaliser as the Azorean side came from 3–0 down at half time to draw at home to Braga. The following 11 January, when his former team Benfica visited the Estádio de São Miguel, he made an error that allowed Haris Seferovic to score and was then sent off just before half time for a foul on Pizzi.

Porto
On 1 July 2021, Cardoso signed a five-year deal at Porto. He made his debut on 28 September in a UEFA Champions League group game at home to Liverpool, due to a warm-up injury to Pepe; his team lost 5–1. His first season at the Estádio do Dragão ended with a league and cup double, though he played under half of the league fixtures and was unused for the cup final win over Tondela.

Cardoso, Diogo Costa, Wilson Manafá and Otávio celebrated their league win by singing insulting chants towards Benfica on social media. The four were given one-game suspensions ruling them out of the 2022 Supertaça Cândido de Oliveira, individual fines of €510 and a club fine of €15,300. On 16 October that year, he scored his first goal for Porto in a 6–0 win at Anadia in the third round of the Taça de Portugal, followed 13 days later by a first league goal in the third minute of a 1–1 draw at Santa Clara.

International career
Cardoso represented Portugal at the 2013 UEFA European Under-19 Football Championship. Cardoso also represented Portugal at Under-20 level during the 2014 Toulon Tournament.

Uncapped, Cardoso was named in the 55-man preliminary Portugal squad for the 2022 FIFA World Cup in Qatar. However, he didn't make the final cut.

Career statistics

Honours
Porto
Primeira Liga: 2021–22
Taça de Portugal: 2021–22
Taça da Liga: 2022–23

References

External links
 Profile at the FC Porto website
 
 
 National team data 

1994 births
Living people
People from Águeda
Sportspeople from Aveiro District
Portuguese footballers
Association football defenders
Primeira Liga players
Liga Portugal 2 players
Scottish Professional Football League players
S.L. Benfica B players
F.C. Paços de Ferreira players
Vitória F.C. players
Rangers F.C. players
C.D. Santa Clara players
FC Porto players
Portugal youth international footballers
Portugal under-21 international footballers
Portuguese expatriate footballers
Portuguese expatriate sportspeople in Scotland
Expatriate footballers in Scotland